Fanny Stollár and Aldila Sutjiadi were the defending champions but chose not to participate.

Alycia Parks and Sachia Vickery won the title, defeating Tímea Babos and Marcela Zacarías in the final, 6–4, 5–7, [10–5].

Seeds

Draw

Draw

References

External links
Main Draw

LTP Charleston Pro Tennis 2 - Doubles